Thrill-ing is the sixth extended play by South Korean boy group The Boyz. It was released on August 9, 2021 through Cre.Ker Entertainment. The EP consists of six tracks, including the lead single "Thrill Ride".

Background 
On June 21, Cre.ker Entertainment announced that The Boyz will be releasing their sixth extended play in August. This will be their first comeback since the conclusion of Kingdom: Legendary War and their first South Korean release in almost a year since 2020's Chase.

On July 26, it was revealed that the title of the extended play will be Thrill-ing and will be released on August 9, with "Thrill Ride" as the lead single. Along with the announcement, a schedule for the group's comeback was also released. It was hinted by members Younghoon and Hyunjae in their Singles Korea interview that  the comeback will be defined by two keywords: energy and party.

On July 27, the first batch of concept photos titled "Splash" was released on the group's social media accounts. On July 28, the second batch of concept photos titled "Bang" was released, while on July 29, the third set was called "Kick" was released.

On July 31, the track list of the album was released.

Track listing

Charts

Weekly charts

Year-end charts

Certifications

Accolades

Release history

References 

2021 EPs
The Boyz (South Korean band) EPs